Club Social, Cultural y Deportivo Unión Coquimbo is a Chilean Football club, their home town is Coquimbo, Chile.

The club were founded on September 1, 2010.

See also
Chilean football league system

Football clubs in Chile
Association football clubs established in 2010
2010 establishments in Chile